Admiral Philip Cavendish (died 1743) of Westbury, Hampshire, was a Royal Navy officer and politician who sat in the House of Commons between 1721 and 1743. He went on to be Commander-in-Chief, Portsmouth.

Biography
Cavendish was the illegitimate son of William Cavendish, 1st Duke of Devonshire M.P . He joined the navy and was a lieutenant RN in 1694 and captain in 1701. From 1705, he was porter of St James's Palace. He married Anne Carteret, daughter of Edward Carteret. In 1719, he led a British squadron at the Battle of Cape St Vincent.

Cavendish was put forward to succeed his father-in-law, Edward Carteret, as Member of Parliament for Bere Alston on the Hobart interest. He was elected  at a by-election on 29 April 1721 but was unseated on petition on 6 June 1721. He was returned unopposed as MP for St. Germans on the Government interest at the 1722 general election. He did not obtain a seat at the 1727 general election although his father-in-law tried to put him forward for Harwich. In 1728 he became a rear-admiral, and in 1732 a vice-admiral.

At the 1734 election, Cavendish was returned unopposed with Sir Charles Wager as MP for Portsmouth on the Admiralty interest. He voted consistently with the Government. In 1736 he was promoted to Admiral and was also promoted to serjeant-porter of St James's Palace, holding the office for the rest of his life. At the 1741 general election he was elected in a contest as MP for Portsmouth. After Walpole's fall he was appointed a Lord Commissioner of the Admiralty as a naval member of Board of Admiralty in March 1742 and was classed as ‘for Pelham’ in October 1742.

Cavendish died without issue on 14 July 1743.

Flag rank appointments
Included: 
 1727–1728, Rear-Admiral of the Blue 
 1728–1729, Rear-Admiral of the White
 1729–1732, Rear-Admiral of the Red 
 1732–1733 Vice-Admiral of the Blue
 1733–1735 Vice-Admiral of the Red
 1735–1743 Admiral of the Blue

References

 

1743 deaths
Royal Navy admirals
British military personnel of the War of the Quadruple Alliance
Members of the Parliament of Great Britain for English constituencies
British MPs 1715–1722
British MPs 1722–1727
British MPs 1734–1741
British MPs 1741–1747
Members of the Parliament of Great Britain for Bere Alston
Lords of the Admiralty